The following outline is provided as an overview of and topical guide to Mercury:

Mercury – smallest and innermost planet in the Solar System. Its orbital period (about 88 Earth days) is less than any other planet in the Solar System. Seen from Earth, it appears to move around its orbit in about 116 days. It has no known natural satellites. It is named after the Roman deity Mercury, the messenger to the gods.

Classification of Mercury 

 Astronomical object
 Gravitationally rounded object
 Planet
 Planet of the Solar System
 Inferior planet
 Inner planet
 Terrestrial planet

Location of Mercury 

 Milky Way Galaxy – barred spiral galaxy
 Orion Arm – a spiral arm of the Milky Way
 Solar System – the Sun and the objects that orbit it, including 8 planets, the planet closest to the Sun being Mercury
 Mercury's orbit

Movement of Mercury 

 Mercury's orbit and rotation
 Transit of Mercury

Features of Mercury 

 Mercury's magnetic field
 Atmosphere of Mercury
 Mercury's extraterrestrial sky
 Geology of Mercury
 Geological features on Mercury
 Craters on Mercury
 Ghost craters on Mercury
 Inter-crater plains on Mercury
 Albedo features on Mercury
 Quadrangles on Mercury

Natural satellites of Mercury 

 Hypothetical moon of Mercury

History of Mercury 

History of Mercury – 
 Pre-Tolstojan – 
 Tests of general relativity – 
 Mercury-crossing minor planets –

Exploration of Mercury 

Exploration of Mercury –

Flyby missions to explore Mercury 

 Mariner 10 –

Direct missions to explore Mercury 

 MESSENGER –

Future of Mercury exploration

Proposed missions to explore Mercury 

 BepiColombo
 Mercury-P
 Colonization of Mercury

Mercury in popular culture 

 Mercury in fiction

See also 

 Outline of astronomy
 Outline of the Solar System
 Outline of space exploration

References

External links 

 Mariner 10 Atlas of Mercury – NASA
 Mercury nomenclature and map with feature names from the USGS planetary nomenclature page
 MESSENGER Mission web site
 Mercury QuickMap from MESSENGER web site
 'BepiColombo', ESA's Mercury Mission 5 June 2013

 Outline
Mercury
Mercury